The M1156 Precision Guidance Kit (PGK), formerly XM1156, is a U.S. Army-designed precision guidance system to turn existing 155 mm artillery shells into smart weapons. The prime contractor was Alliant Techsystems – later merging with Orbital Sciences Corporation to form Orbital ATK, in turn being taken over by Northrop Grumman and renamed Northrop Grumman Innovation Systems – and the industry team includes Interstate Electronics Corporation. By April 2018, more than 25,000 PGKs had been produced.

Overview

In operation the PGK screws into the nose of the projectile much like conventional fuzes. In addition to the fuzing function it provides a GPS guidance package and control surfaces to correct the flight of the shell.  This is analogous to the addition of a Joint Direct Attack Munition (JDAM) tail-kit to a dumb iron bomb, creating a precision guided munition.  The system began production in 2009, was first expected to be in service by 2010, but was ultimately fielded in spring 2013.

This has made unguided artillery dangerous to use in close combat for fear of friendly fire and collateral damage. The M982 Excalibur was fielded as a guided shell that effectively hit within  of a target, but the Army developed the XM1156 as a cheaper alternative. The PGK fuse can be screwed onto existing M549A1 and M795 projectiles, be fired from M109A6 Paladin and M777A2 Howitzer artillery systems, and hits within  of the target at any range.

Small aerodynamic fins allow the system to steer the shell on target.  Its GPS receiver compares the PGK's flight pattern to the coordinates of where it should hit, and the fins adjust its path to match where the round will actually impact.  A fail safe exists where if the shell does not impact within  of the intended target, it will land but not explode; the PGK "decides" five seconds after launch whether it expects to impact close enough to detonate.  This safety feature is expected to give soldiers more confidence when calling in artillery support close to their position. The PGK fuze weighs ,  more than a standard fuze because of the addition of fins and an alternator.  The self-contained system does not need a battery since the alternator inside generates power in flight.  Not only is the PGK fuze cheaper to produce than whole purpose-built guided artillery shells, its purpose to turn standard shells into more accurate rounds enables the millions of rounds already in inventories to be upgraded, while new smart shells have to be built to create a stockpile.

The PGK is compatible with various 155 mm artillery stockpiles to reduce dispersion. It was demonstrated on German DM111 shells in September 2014 fired from a PzH2000 self-propelled howitzer.

Program timeline
 June 2006: Raytheon removed from XM1156 competition.
 July 2006: BAE Systems and Alliant Techsystems selected to take part in a competitive Technical Development (TD) program.
 May 2007: System Demonstration and Development (SDD) contract awarded to Alliant Techsystems.
 October 2012: Soldiers from Fort Bliss became the first troops to fire the XM1156 guidance kit.  24 PGK-equipped projectiles were fired.

Trials
Following fielding in Afghanistan under an urgent materiel release, the PGK underwent First Article Acceptance Tests to verify performance, reliability, and safety. On 6 February 2015, ATK announced that the PGK had passed acceptance testing and been approved for low-rate initial production (LRIP). In April 2015, the PGK completed a first Production Lot Acceptance Test to assess the reliability and provide acceptance of the first low rate initial production lot.  41 out of 42 PGK rounds fired from an M109A6 Paladin performed reliably, a 97 percent success rate.

On 29 June 2015, Orbital ATK announced that the PGK had completed its first production Lot Acceptance Test, demonstrating a median accuracy of less than 10 meters and passing all safety and reliability requirements.  Two additional Lot Acceptance Tests are to confirm production consistency and provide information for product improvements over the course of production. By mid-2016, 4,779 PGK fuses had been produced under the low-rate initial production contract, with full-rate production commencing through 2019.

Variants

In 2021, the U.S. Army plans to produce the upgraded M1156E2/A1, compatible with newer XM1128 high explosive and XM1113 rocket-assisted projectiles to achieve 10-meter accuracy at 30 km and 40 km respectively when fired from a 39-caliber barrel. The follow-on M1156E3/A2 in 2022 will be designed to operate with the GPS-M satellite constellation along with having a cheaper electronic module. After that, a new version known as the Long Range PGK will enable accuracy with XM1113 projectiles out to 70 km when fired from 58-caliber barrels of artillery pieces developed from the Extended Range Cannon Artillery (ERCA) program, as well as being compatible with legacy projectiles and being able to operate in a near-peer GPS threat environment.

Export
On 8 August 2013, Australia requested the sale of 4,002 M1156 Precision Guidance Kits with training and associated equipment for $54 million, something unusual for an item still in low-rate initial production. PGKs were ordered for Australia and Canada in February 2015. Australia is to begin receiving PGKs in the December 2015-January 2016 timeframe.

Deployment
In March 2013, the 15th Field Artillery Regiment in Afghanistan began training on equipment related to the XM1156, and began fielding PGK rounds shortly after, with initial fielding completed by the end of June.  The U.S. Army received 2,400 PGK-equipped shells and the U.S. Marine Corps received 700 shells.

Specifications
 Guidance: GPS
 Accuracy:
 Increment I: < 50 m circular error probable (CEP)
 Increment II: < 30 m CEP
 Unit cost: < $10,000
 Fusing options: Point detonating or proximity airburst

See also
 M982 Excalibur
 XM395 Precision Guided Mortar Munition
 Joint Direct Attack Munition

Footnotes

References

External links
 Precision Guidance Kit (PGK) - ATK

Artillery shells
Military equipment introduced in the 2000s